Krause Bottom is a riparian forest area on the Elwha River along the Geyser Valley trail in Olympic National Park, Washington. It contains a forest of bigleaf maple, red alder, and black cottonwood. The area around it was initially cleared by homesteaders in the late 1890s, but evidence of their activities is difficult to see today.

Landforms of Clallam County, Washington
Landforms of Olympic National Park